University High School may refer to:

Australia
 University High School, Melbourne, Victoria

Canada
 University Hill Secondary School, Vancouver, British Columbia

United States

Arizona
 University High School (Tolleson)
 University High School (Tucson)

California
 University High School (Fresno)
 University High School (Irvine, California), also referred to as "Uni"
 University High School (Los Angeles), also referred to as "Uni"
 University High School (Oakland, California)
 University of San Diego High School, formerly known as University High School, and also known as "Uni"
 San Francisco University High School

Florida
 University High School (Orlando, Florida)
 University High School (Orange City, Florida)
 University School of Nova Southeastern University, Fort Lauderdale

Hawaii
 University Laboratory School

Illinois
 University High School (Normal)
 University Laboratory High School of Urbana, Illinois, also referred to as "Uni"
 University of Chicago Laboratory Schools, the upper classes are nicknamed U-High

Elsewhere
 University Schools, in Greeley, Colorado, formerly known as University High School
 Education Laboratory School, in Honolulu, Hawai‘i, formerly known as University High School
 University High School (Indiana), Carmel, Indiana
 Oxford High School (Oxford, Mississippi), known as "University High School" until 1963
 University High School (Michigan), Ann Arbor, Michigan
 University High School (New Jersey), Newark, New Jersey
 University High School (New Mexico), Roswell, Chaves County, New Mexico
 University High School (San Juan), Puerto Rico
 University High School (Waco, Texas)
 University High School (Washington)
 University High School (West Virginia)
 University Laboratory High School of Baton Rouge, Louisiana
 University School (disambiguation), various schools